Novitates Zoologicae: A Journal of Zoology in Connection With the Tring Museum  was a British scientific journal devoted to systematic zoology. It was edited by Lionel Walter Rothschild and published between 1894 and 1948 by the Tring Museum. Articles were mainly in English, but some were in German. It was succeeded by the Bulletin of the British Museum (Natural History), Zoology Series.

Further reading

External links
 Full text online at the Biodiversity Heritage Library

Zoology journals
Publications established in 1898
Publications disestablished in 1948
Multilingual journals
Defunct journals of the United Kingdom
Academic journals published by museums